Hermann Park/Rice U is an island platformed METRORail light rail station in south-central Houston, Texas, United States. The station was opened on January 1, 2004, and is operated by the Metropolitan Transit Authority of Harris County (METRO). Located in Hermann Park, it is located at the intersection of Fannin Street and Sunset Boulevard. The station also serves the main entrance of Rice University. Adjacent to the station is a stop on the Hermann Park Railroad, a narrow-gauge recreational sightseeing train for park visitors.

In 2016, a Rice University professor on a bicycle was struck and killed by an oncoming train at the station. This and another fatal incident at the adjacent intersection of Main Street and Sunset Boulevard the following year prompted a redesign of the pedestrian and bicyclist crossings leading up to the station.

References

METRORail stations
Railway stations in the United States opened in 2004
2004 establishments in Texas
Railway stations in Texas at university and college campuses
Railway stations in Harris County, Texas